Graham Hunt may refer to:

 Graham Hunt (darts player) (born 1954), Australian darts player
 Graham Hunt (politician) (born 1979), American politician